Matthias Simmen (born in Altdorf, Uri on ) is a retired Swiss biathlete.

He competed in the 2002, 2006 and 2010 Winter Olympics for Switzerland. His best finish was 9th, as a member of the Swiss relay team in 2010. His best individual performance was 23rd, in the 2006 pursuit.

He earned one Biathlon World Cup podium finish, 3rd in the sprint event in the 2006/07 event at Hochfilzen. That was the first podium finish ever for a Swiss biathlete. His best finish at the Biathlon World Championships was 10th, in 2007. His best overall finish in the Biathlon World Cup came in 2006/07, when he placed 29th.

Simmen retired after the 2010–11 season.

World Cup Podiums

References 

1972 births
Living people
Swiss male biathletes
Biathletes at the 2002 Winter Olympics
Biathletes at the 2006 Winter Olympics
Biathletes at the 2010 Winter Olympics
Olympic biathletes of Switzerland
People from the canton of Uri